Paulo Henrique Sampaio Filho, commonly known as Paulinho (born 15 July 2000), is a Brazilian professional footballer who plays as a forward for Brazilian club Atlético Mineiro, on loan from Bayer Leverkusen.

Club career

Vasco da Gama

2017 season
Having progressed through Vasco da Gama's academy, Paulinho was promoted to the club's first-team squad under the management of Milton Mendes on 19 June 2017. On 13 July 2017, two days before his seventeenth birthday, made his professional debut when he was brought on as a 93rd-minute substitute in a 4–1 Brasileirão Série A away win over Vitória. Minutes after entering the field of play, he recorded his professional assist when he set up teammate Guilherme for his side's fourth goal. Eleven days later, he made his first professional start and scored twice in a 2–1 league away win over Atlético Mineiro, becoming the youngest player ever to score at Brasileirão Série A and the first player born at 2000s to score at Brasileirão Série A. On 3 December 2017, Paulinho opened the scoring of a 2–1 home win over Ponte Preta at the last round of 2017 Brasileirão Série A and helped Vasco da Gama to reach a qualification to Copa Libertadores next season.

2018 season
Paulinho made his first Copa Libertadores assist when he set up Evander to open the score in a 4–0 away win over Universidad de Concepción, by the 1st leg of Copa Libertadores second qualifying stage. On the 2nd leg, Paulinho made his first Copa Libertadores goal opening the score in a 2–0 home win over Universidad de Concepción. His goal made him the first player born at 2000s to score at Copa Libertadores.

Bayer Leverkusen
On 27 April 2018, German club Bayer Leverkusen announced that they had reached an agreement with Vasco da Gama for the transfer of Paulinho. The clubs agreed to a €20 million fee, a club-record deal for Vasco. He joined Leverkusen ahead of the 2018–19 season and signed a five-year contract.

Atlético Mineiro (loan)
On 1 December 2022, Paulinho joined Atlético Mineiro on loan until June 2023.

International career

Brazil national youth teams
In March 2017, Paulinho, along with Vinícius Júnior, Lincoln and Alan, helped Brazil win the South American Under-17 Championship. He scored two goals during the tournament, including the opening goal in Brazil's 5–0 win over Chile in the final.

In October 2017, Paulinho helped Brazil reach 3rd place of 2017 FIFA U-17 World Cup. Paulinho scored the winning goals against Spain at Brazil's debut, North Korea and in quarterfinals against Germany.

On 17 June 2021, Paulinho was named in the Brazil squad for the 2020 Summer Olympics. Coming on as a substitute, he scored in Brazil's opening game against Germany.

Career statistics

Club

Honours

Club
Vasco da Gama
Taça Guanabara U17: 2015
Taça Guanabara U20: 2017
Taça Rio U20: 2017
Campeonato Carioca U20: 2017

International
Brazil Olympic
Summer Olympics: 2020

Brazil U17
FIFA U-17 World Cup: Third Place 2017 India
South American Under-17 Football Championship: 2017 Chile
BRICS U-17 Football Cup: 2016 India

Brazil U15
South American Under-15 Football Championship: 2015 Colombia
Brazil U21
Toulon Tournament: 2019

Individual 
 Rio de Janeiro State Championship MVP: 2018
 Rio de Janeiro State Championship Team of the Year: 2018
 Rio de Janeiro State Championship Best Young Player: 2018
 "Revelação do Campeonato Brasileiro 2017" in vote held by Esporte Interativo
 60 of the best young talents in world football by The Guardian
 "30 Revelações do Brasileirão" by globoesporte.com
 "Abusado da Rodada" in the 16th round of the Brasileirão 2017 in vote held by É Gol!!! from SporTV
 "Pintura da Rodada" in the 16th round of the Brasileirão 2017 in vote held by É Gol!!! from SporTV
 "Abusado da Rodada" in the 4th round of the Campeonato Carioca 2018 in vote held by É Gol!!! from SporTV
 Best Player in the 1st match between Vasco da Gama x Jorge Wilstermann by the qualifying stage of the Libertadores 2018
 2016 Montaigu Tournament Top Scorer: 4 goals
 2017 U17 World Cup: 3 goals (Brazil's Top Scorer)

Records
 Youngest player to play for Vasco da Gama at the Professional Era (16 years, 11 months and 29 days)
 Youngest player to score a goal on Campeonato Brasileiro (17 years and 9 days)
 First player born in the 2000s to score a goal on Campeonato Brasileiro
 Vasco da Gama's youngest player to score in the Copa Libertadores (17 years, 6 months and 23 days)
 First player born in the 2000s to score a goal on Copa Libertadores
 First player born in the 2000s to score two goals on Copa Libertadores
 4th youngest Brazilian player to score a goal on Copa Libertadores (19 February 2018)

Personal life
In the aftermath of the goal he scored in a 4–2 victory over Germany at the 2020 Olympics, Paulinho celebrated by imitating an archer in homage to Oshosi, a popular orisha or spirit in Afro-Brazilian religion. Paulinho later stated that he performed the celebration to draw attention to the prejudice followers of Candomblé and other minority religions face in Brazil. He was subsequently invited by the Mocidade Samba School to participate in next year's carnival.

References

External links

2000 births
Living people
Footballers from Rio de Janeiro (city)
Brazilian footballers
Association football forwards
CR Vasco da Gama players
Bayer 04 Leverkusen players
Clube Atlético Mineiro players
Campeonato Brasileiro Série A players
Bundesliga players
Brazil youth international footballers
Brazil under-20 international footballers
Olympic footballers of Brazil
Footballers at the 2020 Summer Olympics
Brazilian expatriate footballers
Brazilian expatriate sportspeople in Germany
Expatriate footballers in Germany
Olympic medalists in football
Olympic gold medalists for Brazil
Medalists at the 2020 Summer Olympics